Goodbye Mothers (French title: Adieu Mères, Arabic title:  - Wada'an Omahat) is a Moroccan film directed by Mohamed Ismaïl. Set-up in Casablanca, the movie depicts the fate of Moroccan  Muslim and Jewish families during the exodus of the Jews of Morocco in the beginning of the 1960s. The plot inspires itself from the tragic sinking of the Egoz, when 44 Moroccan Jews who were clandestinely emigrating to Israel lost their lives.

Plot 

Casablanca, 1960. Henri and Brahim are childhood friends despite their different religions. They are managing the sawmill their fathers created and ran successfully for years. Their wives, Ruth and Fatima are working together in an insurance company, managed by Mr. Ouaknine, who is about to liquidate his estates to make his aliyah to Israel so he can live with his grandchildren. Shoshana Bouzaglo, a very religious and traditional widow, is really upset about her daughter Eliane dating Mehdi, a Muslim boy from her technical school. His father, Mr. Benchekroun, is a successful businessman who specializes in purchasing the estates of Jews who are liquidating their properties so they can emigrate. Mr. Benchetrit, an Israeli officer working with the Alliance Agency, is prompting the Jews to leave Morocco, pretending they aren't safe anymore. Mrs Attar is reluctantly leaving Morocco for Israel, following her son and his wife and kids. As they are leaving, she feels uprooted from her homeland. When Mama Hanna, Ruth's mother, is attacked after a synagogue service, Ruth and Henri decide that it may be the time for them to leave also...

Cast 
 Marc Samuel as Henri Elkaim
 Rachid El Ouali as Brahim
 Souad Amidou as Ruth Elkaim
 Hafida Kassoui as Fatima, Brahim's wive
 Nezha Regragui as Shoshana Bouzaglo
 Rachel Huet as Eliane Bouzaglo
 Tarik Mounim as Mehdi Benchekroun
 Salah Dizane as Mr. Benchekroun
 Malika Hamaoui as Mrs Benchekroun
 Christian Drillaud as Mr. Benchetrit
 Ahmed Alaoui as Mr. Ouaknine
 Amina Rachid as Mrs Attar
 Fatima Regragui as Mama Hanna
 Omar Chenboud as Rabbi Braham

References

External links 
	

2008 films
Films about Jews and Judaism
2000s French-language films
Films about Moroccan Jews
2000s Arabic-language films
2008 drama films
Films about forced migration
2008 multilingual films
Moroccan multilingual films
Moroccan drama films